The Veragua cross-banded tree frog (Smilisca sordida) is a species of frog in the family Hylidae found in Colombia, Costa Rica, Honduras, Nicaragua, and Panama. Its natural habitats are subtropical or tropical moist lowland forests, subtropical or tropical moist montane forests, rivers, plantations, rural gardens, urban areas, heavily degraded former forests, and canals and ditches.

Phylogeny 
The sister species of S. sordida is Smilisca sila, the Panama cross-banded tree frog. Both species utilize a basin construction reproductive model.

References

Smilisca
Frogs of North America
Frogs of South America
Amphibians of Central America
Amphibians of Colombia
Amphibians described in 1863
Taxa named by Wilhelm Peters
Taxonomy articles created by Polbot